{{DISPLAYTITLE:C9H7NO}}
The molecular formula C9H7NO (molar mass: 145.16 g/mol, exact mass: 145.0528 u) may refer to:

 8-Hydroxyquinoline
 Indole-3-carboxaldehyde (I3A)
 Quinolones
 2-Quinolone
 4-Quinolone

Molecular formulas